Allan Normann Fjeldheim (31 July 1918 – 29 March 1995) was a Norwegian pair skater. He competed at the 1948 Winter Olympics, where he placed 10th with partner Margot Walle. He was the Norwegian pairs champion in 1939, 1946, 1947, 1948 and 1949.

Results
(with Bergljot Sandvik)

(with Margot Walle)

References

External links

1918 births
1995 deaths
Norwegian male pair skaters
Olympic figure skaters of Norway
Figure skaters at the 1948 Winter Olympics
Sportspeople from Oslo